Smithfield is a borough in Fayette County, Pennsylvania, United States. The population was 830 at the 2020 census. It is served by the Albert Gallatin Area School District. The town's largest employer is a small wire producing plant run by Nelson Steel.

Geography
Smithfield is located in southwestern Fayette County at  (39.799664, -79.808197).

U.S. Route 119 passes through the center of the borough, leading northeast  to Uniontown, the county seat, and southwest  to Point Marion.

Demographics

As of the census of 2000, there were 854 people, 363 households, and 234 families residing in the borough. The population density was 1,196.5 people per square mile (464.4/km2). There were 384 housing units at an average density of 538.0 per square mile (208.8/km2). The racial makeup of the borough was 99.65% White, 0.23% African American and 0.12% Pacific Islander.

There were 363 households, out of which 26.2% had children under the age of 18 living with them, 52.3% were married couples living together, 10.7% had a female householder with no husband present, and 35.5% were non-families. 32.8% of all households were made up of individuals, and 17.6% had someone living alone who was 65 years of age or older. The average household size was 2.33 and the average family size was 2.99.

In the borough the population was spread out, with 21.4% under the age of 18, 7.0% from 18 to 24, 27.6% from 25 to 44, 23.9% from 45 to 64, and 20.0% who were 65 years of age or older. The median age was 42 years. For every 100 females, there were 86.5 males. For every 100 females age 18 and over, there were 78.9 males.

The median income for a household in the borough was $26,667, and the median income for a family was $35,714. Males had a median income of $25,000 versus $17,404 for females. The per capita income for the borough was $13,618. About 11.7% of families and 14.3% of the population were below the poverty line, including 27.9% of those under age 18 and 9.5% of those age 65 or over.

References

External links

Populated places established in 1799
Pittsburgh metropolitan area
Boroughs in Fayette County, Pennsylvania
1799 establishments in Pennsylvania